Warren Kenneth Paxton Jr. (born December 23, 1962) is an American lawyer and politician who has served as the Attorney General of Texas since January 2015. Paxton has described himself as a Tea Party conservative.

Paxton was re-elected to a third term as Attorney General on November 8, 2022. In his 2022 run, he faced a Republican primary opponent on May 24, George P. Bush, whom he defeated 68% to 32%, thus winning his party's nomination to advance to the 2022 Texas Attorney General election. He previously served as Texas State Senator for the 8th district and the Texas State Representative for the 70th district.

Paxton has been under indictment since 2015 on state securities fraud charges relating to activities prior to taking office. He has pleaded not guilty. As of 2022, he is not standing trial. In October 2020, several high-level assistants in Paxton's office accused him of "bribery, abuse of office and other crimes". After the matter was investigated by federal prosecutors in Texas, in February 2023 the investigation was assumed by the Justice Department in Washington, D.C.

After Joe Biden won the 2020 U.S. presidential election and Donald Trump refused to concede while making false claims of election fraud, Paxton aided Trump in his efforts to overturn the result, from filing the unsuccessful Texas v. Pennsylvania case in the U.S. Supreme Court to speaking at the rally Trump held on January 6, 2021, that immediately preceded the 2021 U.S. Capitol attack.

Background
Paxton was born on Minot Air Force Base in North Dakota where his father was stationed while in the United States Air Force. His parents and their three children lived in a trailer, often without air conditioning, parked outside wherever his father was temporarily stationed. At various times, they lived in Florida, New York, North Carolina, California, and Oklahoma. A lifelong football fan, Paxton carried a jersey autographed by Bill Bates, formerly of the Dallas Cowboys. Bates later was named Paxton's campaign treasurer.

At the age of twelve, Paxton nearly lost an eye in a game of hide-and-seek; a misdiagnosis led to long-term problems with his vision. As a result, his good eye is green; his damaged one, brown and droopy. He further injured his eye while in college.

Paxton received a psychology degree in 1985 and a Master of Business Administration in 1986, both from Baylor University, where he was elected president of the student government.
Paxton then worked for two years as a management consultant before returning to school in 1988. In 1991, he received a Juris Doctor degree from the University of Virginia.

Paxton worked at Strasburger & Price, L.L.P. from 1991 to 1995, and J.C. Penney Company, Inc. from 1995 to 2002.

Texas legislature

House of Representatives (2003–2013)
In 2002, Paxton ran in the Republican primary for the Texas House in District 70. He captured 39.45% of the vote and moved into a runoff with Bill Vitz, whom he then defeated with 64% of the vote. He went on to face Fred Lusk (D) and Robert Worthington (L) for the newly redistricted open seat. On November 4, 2002, Paxton won with 28,012 votes to Lusk's 7,074 votes and Worthington's 600 votes.

Paxton won re-election against Democrat Martin Woodward in 2004. Paxton captured 76% of the vote, or 58,520 votes compared to 18,451 votes for Woodward. Paxton won re-election in 2006, defeating Rick Koster (D) and Robert Virasin (L). Paxton received 30,062 votes to Koster's 12,265 votes and Virasin's 1,222 votes. Paxton won re-election by again defeating Robert Virasin (L), 73,450 to 11,751 votes. Paxton ran unopposed for re-election in 2010.

After getting re-elected, Paxton ran for Speaker of the Texas House of Representatives against Joe Straus of District 121 in Bexar County and fellow Republican Warren Chisum of District 88 in Pampa, Texas. Paxton said that if elected speaker, he would take "bold action in defense of our conservative values." Sensing certain defeat, Paxton pulled out of the Speaker's race before the vote. Paxton was endorsed by HuckPAC, the official political action committee of Mike Huckabee, and was endorsed by the National Rifle Association.  Straus was elected to his second term as Speaker and was re-elected in 2013, 2015, and 2017.

Texas State Senate (2013–2015)
Paxton was in the Texas State Senate from 2013 until January 2015 when his term as Attorney General began.

Attorney General elections

2014 election

Paxton became a candidate for Texas attorney general when the incumbent Greg Abbott decided to run for governor to succeed the retiring Rick Perry. Paxton led a three-candidate field in the Republican primary held on March 4, 2014, polling 566,114 votes (44.4%). State Representative Dan Branch of Dallas County received 426,595 votes (33.5 percent). Eliminated in the primary was Texas Railroad Commissioner Barry Smitherman of Austin, who polled the remaining 281,064 (22.1 percent). Paxton faced Dan Branch in the runoff election on May 27, 2014, and won with 465,395 votes (63.63 percent). Branch received 265,963 votes (36.36 percent).

In the November 4, 2014, general election, Paxton defeated his Democratic opponent, an attorney from Houston named Sam Houston.

Paxton took office on January 5, 2015. Paxton's campaign raised $945,000 in the first half of 2016, leaving Paxton with just under $3 million in his campaign account for a potential 2018 re-election bid.

Paxton's wife, Angela Paxton, his closest political advisor, often opens up his events with a musical performance. She calls her husband "a very competitive person". Paxton won the attorney general's election without the endorsement of a single Texas newspaper. In 2018, Angela Paxton won the District 8 seat in the Texas Senate.

2018 election

In 2018, Paxton ran unopposed for re-election in the Republican primary. Having received the endorsement of U.S. President Donald Trump, Paxton won a second term as attorney general in the general election on November 6, 2018, narrowly defeating Democratic nominee Justin Nelson, a lawyer, and Libertarian Party nominee Michael Ray Harris by a margin of 4,173,538 (50.6 percent) to 3,874,096 (47 percent) and Harris receiving 2.4%. Justin Nelson's campaign ad for attorney general included surveillance video from the Collin County courthouse in 2012, showing Paxton taking a Montblanc pen worth $1,000, which had been accidentally left behind at a metal detector by fellow lawyer Joe Joplin. The pen was later returned "when the error was realized", said a spokesman for Paxton.

2022 election

The 2022 Texas Attorney General election took place on November 8, 2022, where Paxton won the Attorney General of Texas office for the third time. Paxton advanced to the November 8 general election after winning primary contests on March 1 and May 24.

Attorney General of Texas (2015–present)

Abortion 

In 2022, Paxton was sued by Fund Texas Choice, a non-profit organization aiming to prevent Paxton from prosecuting people who assist Texans to receive out-of-state abortions. In September 2022, a process server alleged in an affidavit for the court that when he attempted to serve a subpoena to Paxton at his home, he saw Paxton coming to the door but turning back; Paxton's wife answered the door saying Paxton was on the phone, with the process server stating that he had important legal documents for Paxton; Paxton left the house an hour later but ran back into the house when the process server called his name; minutes later Paxton ran out of the house and left in a truck driven by his wife, ignoring the process server stating his intentions. Paxton responded claiming that the process server "yelled unintelligibly, and charged toward me. I perceived this person to be a threat", while further stating that the process server "is lucky this situation did not escalate further or necessitate force".

Affordable Care Act
Paxton initiated a lawsuit seeking to have the Affordable Care Act (Obamacare) ruled unconstitutional in its entirety.

COVID-19 pandemic 
In 2020, during the COVID-19 pandemic, Paxton threatened to file lawsuits against local governments unless they rescinded stay-at-home orders and rescinded rules regarding the use of face masks to combat the spread of coronavirus. The city of Austin encouraged restaurants to keep logs of contact information, so as to as to ensure contact tracing in the event of an outbreak; Paxton described this as "Orwellian." Paxton sued the city of Austin again in December 2020 when the city implemented restrictions preventing indoor dining and drinking on New Years weekend amid surging COVID-19 cases. In March 2021, Paxton filed a lawsuit against Austin as well as Travis County, this time for the city and county continuing their local mask wearing requirements after Governor Abbott had signed an order ending the statewide mask-wearing mandate.

Gerrymandering 
Paxton defended Texas in a federal lawsuit involving allegations that Texas's congressional districts were gerrymandered. In 2017, a three-judge panel of a U.S. federal court based in San Antonio ruled that the Republican-controlled Texas Legislature drew congressional-district to discriminate against minority voters, and ordered the redrawing of Texas's 35th and 27th congressional districts. Paxton appealed the ruling, contending that the previous maps were lawful, and vowed to "aggressively defend the maps on all fronts"; U.S. Representative Lloyd Doggett criticized the appeal as a "desperate, highly questionable Paxton-Abbott maneuver" coming "after yet another ruling against the state of Texas for intentional discrimination". Texas won on appeal when in a 5-4 decision the Supreme Court ruled there was insufficient evidence to prove that state Republicans acted in bad faith and engaged in intentional discrimination with respect to the 27th and 35th congressional districts.

Human trafficking
Paxton created a human trafficking unit in the AG office in 2015. In 2019, he convinced Texas lawmakers to more than quadruple the human trafficking unit's annual funding. The year after, the unit did not secure a single human trafficking conviction and only four in 2020.

Immigration
In 2018, Paxton falsely claimed that undocumented immigrants had committed over 600,000 crimes since 2011 in Texas. PolitiFact said that it had debunked the numbers before, and that the numbers exceed the state's estimates by more than 400%.

Obama executive orders
Paxton led a coalition of twenty-six states challenging President Barack Obama's Deferred Action for Parents of Americans and Lawful Permanent Residents (DAPA) executive action, which granted deferred action status to certain undocumented immigrants who had lived in the United States since 2010 and had children who were American citizens or lawful permanent residents. Paxton argued that the president should not be allowed to "unilaterally rewrite congressional laws and circumvent the people's representatives." The Supreme Court heard the case, United States v. Texas, and issued a split 4-4 ruling in the case in June 2016. Because of the split ruling, a 2015 lower-court ruling invalidating Obama's plan was left in place.

In July 2017, Paxton led a group of Republican Attorneys General and Idaho Governor Butch Otter in threatening the Trump administration that they would litigate if the president did not terminate the Deferred Action for Childhood Arrivals policy that had been put into place by president Barack Obama, although never implemented in Texas because of legal action on behalf of the state. The other Attorneys General who joined in making the threats to Trump included Steve Marshall of Alabama, Leslie Rutledge of Arkansas, Lawrence Wasden of Idaho, Derek Schmidt of Kansas, Jeff Landry of Louisiana, Doug Peterson of Nebraska, Alan Wilson of South Carolina, and Patrick Morrisey of West Virginia.

Trump executive orders
In 2017, Paxton voiced support for the application of eminent domain to obtain right-of-way along the Rio Grande in Texas for construction of the border wall advocated by President Donald Trump as a means to curtail illegal immigration. Paxton said that private landowners must receive a fair price when property is taken for the pending construction. He said that the wall serves "a public purpose providing safety to people not only along the border, but to the entire nation. ... I want people to be treated fairly, so they shouldn't just have their land taken from them," but there must be just compensation.

In 2017, Paxton joined thirteen other state attorneys general in filing a friend-of-the-court briefs in defense of both Trump's first and second executive orders on travel and immigration primarily from majority-Muslim countries (informally referred to as the "Muslim ban"). In filings in the U.S. Court of Appeals for the Ninth Circuit, U.S. Court of Appeals for the Fourth Circuit, and the U.S. Supreme Court, Paxton argued that the order—which places a 90-day ban on the issuance of visas to travel from six designated majority-Muslim countries, imposes a 120-day halt on the admission of refugees to the U.S., and caps annual refugee admissions to 50,000 people—is constitutionally and legally valid.

In May 2017, Paxton filed a preemptive lawsuit designed to ascertain the constitutionality of the new Texas law imposing penalties on sanctuary cities, known as SB 4, signed into law by Governor Greg Abbott.  The law imposes penalties on local officials who place restrictions on their police forces or other agencies' cooperation with immigration enforcement, and requires county jails to honor requests from U.S. Immigration and Customs Enforcement to hold detainees suspected of being eligible for deportation. The suit asked the United States District Court for the Western District of Texas to clarify whether the law is at odds with the Fourth and Fourteenth constitutional amendments or is not in conflict with some other federal law. Paxton said that the measure "is constitutional, lawful and a vital step in securing our borders." Among those opposed to the measure are the police chiefs and sheriffs of some of the largest jurisdictions in Texas. Critics call the ban legalization of discrimination against minorities, and suits against the legislation are expected to be filed. Although initially key aspects of the law were enjoined by the court, the US Fifth Circuit Court of Appeals upheld nearly all of it on appeal, except for a provision that interfered with the First Amendment right to freedom of expression on the subject by local officials.

Environment

Challenge to the Clean Power Plan
Paxton has mounted a legal challenge to the Clean Power Plan, which is President Obama's "state-by-state effort to fight climate change by shifting away from coal power to cleaner-burning natural gas and renewable resources." Paxton has said that the Environmental Protection Agency (EPA) is trying to "force Texas to change how we regulate energy production" through an "unprecedented expansion of federal authority." The Clean Power Plan would require Texas to cut an annual average of 51 million tons of emissions, down 21 percent from 2012 levels. Paxton says the required reductions would cost the state jobs, push electricity costs too high, and threaten reliability on the electrical grid. Paxton says there is no evidence that the plan will mitigate climate change, directly contradicting studies by the EPA that have shown the regulation will reduce carbon pollution by 870 million tons in 2030. He further asserts that the EPA lacks the statutory authority to write the state's policies.

ExxonMobil litigation 

In 2016, Paxton was one of eleven Republican state attorneys general who sided with ExxonMobil in the company's suit to block a climate change probe by the Commonwealth of Massachusetts.

Paxton and the other state AGs filed an amicus curiae brief, contending that Massachusetts Attorney General Maura Healey used her office to "tip the scales on a public policy debate, undermine the first Amendment and abuse the office's subpoena power." Healey had launched a probe of ExxonMobil's historical marketing and sale of fossil fuel products, requiring the company to produce 40 years worth of documents regarding fossil fuel products and securities. Healey said the documents would prove that ExxonMobil "knew about the risks of climate change decades ago and fraudulently concealed that knowledge from the public." The amicus brief supported Exxon Mobil's motion for a preliminary injunction. Paxton questioned Healey's use of law-enforcement authority regarding the global warming controversy, which he called an "ongoing public policy debate of international importance." Paxton described Healey's attempts to obtain historical company records for a public policy debate as a threat to freedom of speech, stating: "The Constitution was written to protect citizens from government witch-hunts that are nothing more than an attempt to suppress speech on an issue of public importance, just because a government official happens to disagree with that particular viewpoint." The brief portrayed climate change as an issue that was still a matter of scientific debate, although in fact the scientific consensus is that the earth is warming and human activity is primarily responsible.

U.S. Virgin Islands attorney general Claude Walker had also issued a subpoena for Exxon's records. Paxton issued a request to intervene in the case, stating: "What is Exxon Mobil's transgression? Holding a view about climate change that the Attorney General of the Virgin Islands disagrees with. This is about the criminalization of speech and thought." Walker dropped the subpoena in June 2016.

Labor lawsuits
Paxton sued the Obama administration over a new rule by the United States Department of Labor which would make five million additional workers eligible for overtime pay. The new rule would mean workers earning up to an annual salary of $47,500 would become eligible for overtime pay when working more than 40 hours per week. Paxton has said the new regulations "may lead to disastrous consequences for our economy." Along with Texas, twenty other states have joined the lawsuit.

Paxton is involved in a legal challenge to a rule by the Department of Labor which forces employers to report any "actions, conduct or communications" undertaken to "affect an employee's decisions regarding his or her representation or collective bargaining rights". Known as the "persuader rule", the new regulation went into effect in April 2016. Opponents of the rule say it will prevent employers from speaking on labor issues or seeking legal counsel. In June 2016, a federal judge granted a preliminary injunction against the rule. Paxton called the injunction "a victory for the preservation of the sanctity of attorney-client confidentiality".

LGBT rights
As Attorney General, Paxton appointed several social conservatives and opponents of LGBT rights to positions in his department.

In June 2015, after the issuance of the Obergefell v. Hodges decision, in which the Supreme Court ruled that same-sex couples have a constitutional right to marry, Paxton offered support for clerks who refused to issue marriage licenses to same-sex couples. His statement said, "I will do everything I can from this office to be a public voice for those standing in defense of their rights."

In 2016, Paxton led a coalition of thirteen states that sought an injunction to block a guidance letter issued by the Department of Education and Department of Justice that interpreted Title IX to require public schools to allow transgender students to use restrooms that accorded with their gender identity. Paxton submitted court filings alleging the Obama administration had "conspired to turn workplaces and educational settings across the country into laboratories for a massive social experiment" and termed the directive a "gun to the head" that threatens the independence of school districts. In September 2016, Paxton and his wife had dinner with activist Amber Briggle and her family, including her trans son. The states dropped the suit after the directive was revoked by President Donald Trump.

On February 18, 2022, Paxton issued a new interpretation of Texas law in a written opinion that characterized gender-affirming health care (such as hormone treatments and puberty blockers) for transgender youths as child abuse. Established medical practice allows for puberty blockers to be explored after initial signs of puberty, although evidence for their use is still evolving. On February 28, Amber Briggle was notified that the Texas Department of Family and Protective Services had opened an investigation into her family. On March 11, a Texas District Court issued a temporary injunction, which temporarily stopped state investigations into families who provide gender-affirming medical care for their children, and scheduled a trial for July 11, 2022.

In June 2022, Paxton said he would defend state laws against 'sodomy' or same-sex sexual relationships if the Supreme Court precedent invalidating such laws, the Lawrence v. Texas decision, was overturned. On March 17, 2022, Paxton made a post on Twitter in which he referred to U.S. Assistant Secretary for Health Rachel Levine – a trans woman — as a man. Twitter flagged the tweet for violating its conduct rules, but did not remove the post. The following day, Paxton tweeted a statement in which he again referred to Levine as a man, and stated that he was "exploring legal options" against Twitter. During that same month, according to a report by The Washington Post, Paxton's office requested a list of citizens who had changed their gender on their driver's licenses, circumventing the accepted procedure of contacting DPS' government relations and general counsel's offices by instead directly contacting the driver license division staff. No reason was given for this request. In August, the data was provided to Paxton's office, despite that in November 2022, officials indicated the office had no such information.

Volkswagen, Apple, and MoneyGram lawsuits
In 2012, Paxton was part of a lawsuit by 33 state attorneys general against Apple, charging the company with violating antitrust laws by conspiring with publishers to artificially raise the prices of electronic books. Apple was ordered to pay $400 million to U.S. consumers who paid artificially-inflated prices for e-books, and $20 million to the states in reimbursement for legal costs.

As part of a suit involving 44 states, in June 2016, it was announced that Volkswagen would pay the state of Texas $50 million in relation to the Volkswagen emissions scandal. Paxton, and most other states, had sued the company in 2015 in connection with the automaker's admitted use of software that allowed its vehicles to circumvent emissions limits.

Paxton is part of a 21-state lawsuit against the state of Delaware. The lawsuit alleges that MoneyGram gave uncashed checks to the state of Delaware instead of the state where the money order or travelers check was bought. The case has gone directly to the U.S. Supreme Court because it is a dispute among states. Paxton said an audit showed that Delaware owed other states $150 million, and that Delaware unlawfully took possession of uncashed checks instead of sending the checks back to the states where the money orders were purchased. The state of Delaware disputes these claims.

Lawsuit over homestead tax exemptions
In 2015, the Texas State Legislature passed a law implementing property tax reductions by increasing the homestead exemption to $25,000 and prohibiting localities from reducing or repealing any local option homestead exemption already on the books. After this law was passed, 21 school districts reduced or eliminated their local optional homestead exemptions.
In 2016, Paxton intervened in a lawsuit challenging the practice of school districts reducing or repealing their local optional homestead exemptions.

Second Amendment lawsuits
In 2016, three University of Texas at Austin professors sued in an effort to ban concealed handguns from campus, blocking the state's campus carry law. Paxton called the lawsuit "frivolous" and moved to dismiss. The federal district court dismissed the suit in 2017, and the dismissal was upheld by a three-judge panel of the 5th Circuit Court of Appeals in 2018.

In 2016, Paxton sued the City of Austin to allow license holders to openly carry handguns in Austin City Hall. Paxton prevailed, and the court decided not only that the city of Austin must allow such carry, but also ordered it to pay a fine to the state for each day it prevented investigators from the attorney general's office from carrying their firearms.

Voting rights 
In March 2017, Paxton told The Washington Times that he was convinced that voter fraud exists in Texas, and claimed that local election officials in Texas were not on the lookout for detecting fraud. According to a July 11, 2021 The New York Times, even though voter fraud is "very rare in the United States"—most cases are minor errors on the part of a voter, Paxton "made it a mission" as attorney general to lay voter-charge charges; According to a July 9, 2021 article in The Guardian, "[F]ew prosecutors have pursued election-related crimes more than Paxton."

By February 2017—as part of his "crusade" against voter fraud Paxton sought to investigate 2016 Texas voting records—such as access to individual voting history and application materials for voter registrations—to uncover potential voter fraud, for example, voting by non-citizens or in the name of the deceased. In February 2017, officials in Bexar County said there have been no major cases of voter fraud in San Antonio. However, the Associated Press reported that the top election official in Bexar County estimates that nearly six hundred affidavits submitted by voters declined to present identification and should have been declined. Instead, the official said such voters should have been required to cast provisional ballots. AP projected that the overall number who cast improper affidavits as 13,500 in the largest Texas counties. Fort Bend County's top elections official said that these cases are not voter fraud, noting that only those who were registered to vote qualified for an affidavit, and that "poll workers were trained to 'err on the side of letting people use the affidavit instead of denying them the chance to vote.'" According to a May 2, 2017 ProPublica article', there was no evidence of widespread voter fraud in Texas. In 2017, the Texas Tribune reported that, experts had said there was no reliable evidence of widespread voter fraud in the United States, and a Texas study of elections over a decade determined that there were about three cases of fraud for every one million votes in the state.

In 2017, the San Antonio Express-News criticized the state's voter identification law, which Paxton seeks to have reinstated after it was struck down by United States District Judge Nelva Gonzales Ramos of Corpus Christi, who found the measure to be a violation of the Voting Rights Act, and found that it was passed with the intent to discriminate against black and Hispanic voters. Paxton's office appealed the decision. Appeals continue in the case. By May 2017, the Office of the AG's "efforts to enact and enforce the strictest voter ID law in the nation were so plagued by delays, revisions, court interventions and inadequate education that the casting of ballots in the 2016 election was inevitably troubled."

Prioritizing voter-fraud prosecutions
Of the voter fraud cases that his office chose to pursue, 72% were people of color. Paxton had also filed charges against Hervis Rogers, a Black man who was working two jobs. Rogers had received media coverage as a "national hero" for waiting six hours in a line at Houston's Texas Southern University in Harris County, Texas in order to vote in the March 2020 Democratic presidential primary election. A July 9, 2021 article in The Guardian said that Rogers was a symbol for Black Americans of "tenacity" in making his voice heard. Rogers had been convicted in 1995 for "burglary and intent to commit theft" and served nine years in prison. His 2004 parole expired in June 2020. In Texas it is illegal for a person to vote if they have been convicted of a felony until the completion of the sentence, probation and/or parole. Bail for Rogers was set at $100,000—an "extremely high bail amount"—which he could not afford. Hervis was not charged in Harris County, Texas, county. a majority-minority community. Instead he was charged in the adjacent Montgomery County, Texas, where only 4% of the population is Black, and was jailed until The Bail Project, a non-profit, posted his bail." If convicted he could be sentenced to 40 years in prison for the non-violent offense. It's not the first time that Paxton had indulged in "forum shopping." He tried to get a Harris County elections official indicted and tried for alleged interference with a poll watcher, attempting to obtain that indictment in Montgomery County.

Paxton admitted to KXAN-TV that few people served time for voter fraud. The station found just 24 of 138 people convicted of voter fraud between 2004 and September 2020 spent time in jail. Paxton explained, "But I think the good thing about finding it, and doing a thorough job of investigation and prosecution, is at least you send the message to people that if you're going to do this, there is some risk that you're going to end up in prison for committing voter fraud." Paxton's office spent almost double the time working on voter fraud cases in 2021 as it did in 2018. It recorded spending over 22,000 staff hours on the task, but resolved only 16 prosecutions, half as many as two years prior. All of the cases were in Harris County, lodged against voters who had provided inaccurate addresses on their voter registration forms. None of those defendants were sentenced to jail time. The costs of the 230 ongoing investigations and 360 prosecutions were formidable: The chief of election fraud is paid about $140,000, a second attorney received $97,000. Two other attorneys were each being paid about $85,000.

Paxton's voter fraud investigation unit had a budget of $1.9 million to $2.2 million in 2021. By the end of the year, the office had closed only three cases of fraud.

Opposition to absentee voting expansion 
In May 2020, Paxton opposed an expansion of absentee voting to voters who lack immunity to COVID-19. A state district judge ruled that such voters could apply for absentee ballots under a statutory provision that accommodates disabled individuals. After the ruling, Paxton publicly contradicted the district judge and subsequently persuaded the Texas Supreme Court to address the issue of eligibility in a separate case he filed directly in that court, while putting the appeal of the district court case on hold.

During the 2020 election season, which occurred during the COVID-19 pandemic, Paxton sued Harris County Clerk Chris Hollins, seeking to block him from sending applications for absentee ballots to the county's 2.4 million registered voters accompanied by instructions regarding eligibility as clarified by the Texas Supreme Court. Paxton lost in the trial court and in the intermediate court of appeals, but the Texas Supreme Court reversed and directed the trial court to enter an injunction against Hollins. The mail-vote promotion was part and parcel of Harris County's package of innovative measures to reduce the COVID-19 infection risk of in-person voting while maximizing opportunities for all voters to participate under pandemic conditions. The Republican Party of Texas opposed the expansion of voting by mail and other accommodations, and filed its own legal actions seeking to stop Hollins through the court system.

Challenge to 2020 presidential election results
Paxton's office spent more than 22,000 hours looking for voter fraud after the 2020 election, finding only 16 cases of false addresses on registration forms out of nearly 17 million registered voters.

On December 8, 2020, Paxton sued the states of Georgia, Michigan, Wisconsin, and Pennsylvania, where certified results showed President-elect Joe Biden the victor over President Donald Trump, alleging a variety of unconstitutional actions in their presidential balloting, arguments that had already been rejected in other courts. In Texas v. Pennsylvania, Paxton asked the United States Supreme Court to invalidate the states' sixty-two electoral votes, allowing Trump to be declared the winner of a second presidential term. Because the suit was cast as a dispute between states, the Supreme Court had original jurisdiction, although it often declines to hear such suits. There is no evidence of widespread illegal voting in the election. Paxton's lawsuit included claims that had been tried unsuccessfully in other courts and shown to be false. Officials from the four states described Paxton's lawsuit as recycling false and disproven claims of irregularity. Trump and seventeen Republican state attorneys general filed motions to support the case, the merits of which were sharply criticized by legal experts and politicians. Election law expert Rick Hasen described the lawsuit as "the dumbest case I've ever seen filed on an emergency basis at the Supreme Court." Republican Senator Ben Sasse opined that the situation of Paxton initiating the lawsuit "looks like a fella begging for a pardon filed a PR stunt", in reference to Paxton's own legal issues (securities fraud charges and abuse of office allegations). Paxton has called the pardon speculation "an absurdly laughable conspiracy theory" and said the lawsuit is about election integrity. The case was quickly dismissed on December 11.

Later it was revealed that the failed suit had been drafted by Lawyers for Trump, a group connected to the Trump campaign. Several other state attorneys general turned down the offer to file the suit. Solicitor General of Texas Kyle D. Hawkins, who would ordinarily represent the state in cases before the Supreme Court, refused to let his name be attached to the suit. The Texas Attorney General hired Lawrence J. Joseph of Lawyers for Trump as special counsel for filing the suit.

After the failure of his lawsuit, Paxton traveled to Washington to speak at a political rally for President Trump on January 6, 2021.  In his speech, Paxton told the crowd "we will not quit fighting".  Immediately following, the crowd of Trump supporters left the rally and stormed the United States Capitol building in a riot that led to the death of five people, including a police officer. In reaction to the violence and loss of life, Paxton falsely claimed that the rioters were liberal activists posing as Trump supporters. He was the only state attorney general to not condemn the insurrection.

In early 2021, Paxton's office refused to provide his work emails and text messages he sent or received while in Washington on January 6, after several Texas news organizations requested them in accordance with the state's open records law. In January 2022, the Travis County district attorney gave Paxton four days to comply or face a lawsuit.

In October 2021, Paxton falsely claimed that Biden "overthrew" Trump in the 2020 election.

Religion in schools
Paxton "has often criticized what he calls anti-Christian discrimination in Texas schools." In 2015, Paxton opposed an atheist group's legal action seeking a halt to the reading of religious prayers before school board meetings. In December 2016, Paxton gained attention after intervening in a dispute in Killeen, Texas, in which a middle school principal told a nurse's aide to take down a six-foot poster in the school containing a quote from Christian scripture. Paxton sided with the aide, who won in court.

In early 2017 Paxton objected to a Texas school's use of an empty classroom to allow its Muslim students to pray, issuing a press release that claimed that "the high school's prayer room is ... apparently excluding students of other faiths."  School officials said that Paxton had never asked them about this assertion, and that the room was a spare room used by faculty and non-Muslim students as well as for multiple activities, from grading papers to Buddhist meditation. The Frisco Independent School District superintendent, in a letter sent in response to Paxton, called his press release "a publicity stunt by the [Office of Attorney General] to politicize a nonissue."

Paxton v. Garland 
Texas v. Garland is a lawsuit Paxton filed against the United States government. In the case, he asserts that the $1.7 trillion federal spending law that was passed in 2020 to fund the federal government is unconstitutional. In the suit, he asserts that passage of the law was unconstitutional because of the House's use of proxy votes at the time, due to COVID-19 pandemic restrictions.

Legal issues

State securities fraud felony indictment
On July 28, 2015, a state grand jury indicted Paxton on three criminal charges: two counts of securities fraud (a first-degree felony) and one count of failing to register with state securities regulators (a third-degree felony). Paxton's indictment marked the first such criminal indictment of a Texas Attorney General in thirty-two years since Texas Attorney General Jim Mattox was indicted for bribery in 1983. The complainants in the case are Joel Hochberg, a Florida businessman and Byron Cook, a former Republican member of the Texas House of Representatives. Paxton and Cook were former friends and roommates while serving together in the Texas House. Three special prosecutors were trying the state's case.

The state prosecution against Paxton grows out of Paxton selling shares of Servergy Inc., a technology company, to investors in 2011. Prosecutors allege that Paxton sold shares of Servergy to investors (raising $840,000) while failing to disclose that he was receiving compensation from the company in the form of 100,000 shares of stock in return. Paxton says the 100,000 shares of stock he received from Servergy's founder and CEO were a gift, and not a sales commission, and they were provided to Paxton long before the sales transactions occurred.

On August 3, 2015, following the unsealing of the grand jury indictment, Paxton was arrested and booked. He pleaded not guilty, and has portrayed "the case against him as a political witch-hunt." Paxton and his supporters claim that the prosecution has its origin in a dispute among Texas Republicans, with conservatives like Paxton on one side and moderates like Cook on the other, and suggest that Cook's complaint, several years after the Servergy deal, was political payback.

Paxton unsuccessfully sought to quash the indictments. This challenge was rejected by the trial judge, the Fifth Court of Appeals, and the Court of Criminal Appeals, Texas' criminal court of last resort.

Paxton's trial has been delayed multiple times over side issues, such as the venue where the trial will take place and the amount of the special prosecutors' fees. In March 2017, District Judge George Gallagher, a Republican from Fort Worth, granted the prosecution's motion for a change of venue, moving the trial to Houston in Harris County. Gallagher also denied Paxton's motion to dismiss one of the charges against him because of issues which arose about the grand jury. In May 2017, the Fifth Court of Appeals of Texas agreed with Paxton that the transfer of Paxton's trial to Houston required assignment of the case to a new judge to replace Judge Gallagher and all orders issued by Judge Gallagher after the change of venue were voided. The current judge in the case is Robert Johnson of the 177th District Court in Harris County. Johnson was chosen at random to preside.

In November 2018, the Texas Court of Criminal Appeals invalidated the trial court's order approving of payments of attorneys' fees to the special prosecutors in the case, and directed the lower court to issue payments "in accordance with an approved fee schedule," siding with county commissioners in Paxton's home county of Collin County, who had rejected the prosecutors's invoice. The special prosecutors in the case have suggested that if they are not paid, they could withdraw from prosecution of Paxton. After the Texas Court of Criminal Appeals declined to reconsider the motion, one of three prosecutors pursuing criminal charges against Paxton asked to step down from the case.

Paxton filed a motion to move the case from Harris County to his native Collin County, in 2019. The trial court granted the motion, but in 2020, the 1st Court of Appeals in Houston blocked the case from being moved to Collin County pending further consideration of the matter. In May 2021, a panel of three justices ruled that the trial for Paxton's felony fraud charges should be moved to Collin County where Paxton lives instead of Harris County. The decision by the panel of three judges to move Paxton's trial back to Collin County was appealed by the prosecution in June. In September the appeals court denied the prosecution appeal. Prosecutors again  filed another appeal this time with the Texas Court of Criminal Appeals. In March 2022, it was reported that  the appeal had officially been put on the Texas Court of Criminal Appeals case docket

Securities and Exchange Commission civil action
In 2016, the U.S. Securities and Exchange Commission (SEC) filed a civil enforcement action against Paxton in the United States District Court for the Eastern District of Texas. The SEC's complaint specifically charged Paxton with violating various provisions of the Securities Act of 1933 and various provisions (including Rule 10b-5) of the Securities Exchange Act of 1934 by defrauding the Servergy investors. Paxton denied the allegations. One of the defendants and Servergy itself reached a separate settlement with the SEC, agreeing to pay $260,000 in penalties.

In October 2016, U.S. District Judge Amos L. Mazzant III conditionally dismissed the complaint, finding the SEC had not alleged Paxton had any legal obligation to inform investors that he was receiving a commission, but gave the SEC two weeks to refile an amended complaint. The SEC refiled its securities fraud claims against Paxton, making the additional allegations that Paxton and Cook's investment club required all of its members to accept the same risks on all investments and that it specifically forbade members from making money off investments of other members. The SEC further alleged that Paxton did not properly disclose his Servergy ownership stake on his taxes and that he attempted to conceal the stake by at different times claiming it was his fee for legal services, that it was a gift, and that he had only received it after investing money.

In March 2017, Mazzant dismissed the civil securities fraud case, ruling that Paxton "no plausible legal duty" to inform investors that he would earn a commission if they purchased stock in a technical company that Paxton represented. With the second dismissal of the case with prejudice, the SEC could not bring new action on the same claim against Paxton. The dismissal of the SEC case did not have a direct impact on the state criminal case, which remained pending. However, the burden of proof in criminal court is higher than in civil court.

Whistleblower allegations against Paxton
In October 2020, seven of Paxton's top aides published a letter to the office's director of human resources, accusing Paxton of improper influence, abuse of office, bribery and other crimes, and said they had provided information to law enforcement and asked them to investigate. The letter was signed by First Assistant Attorney General Jeff Mateer, and the deputy and deputy attorneys general overseeing the Office's divisions for criminal investigations, civil litigation, administration, and policy. Paxton denied misconduct and said he would not resign. By the end of the month, all seven whistleblowers had left the office: three resigned, two were fired, and two were put on leave.

The Associated Press reported that the allegations involved Paxton illegally using his office to benefit real estate developer Nate Paul, who had donated $25,000 to Paxton's 2018 campaign. The Associated Press also reported that the allegations include the claim that Paxton had an extramarital affair with a woman, and that he had later advocated for that woman to be hired by Paul's company, World Class. Paul has acknowledged employing the woman, but denied that he had done so on Paxton's behalf.

In 2020, four of the former members of the Texas AG's Office sued the Office of the Attorney General, alleging that Paxton fired them for reporting misconduct to law enforcement, a form of illegal retaliation under the state's Whistleblower Act. In 2021, the district court denied Paxton's motion to dismiss the suit. Paxton's office appealed, claiming that the Whistleblower Act did not apply to allegations of misconduct by Paxton, as an elected executive-branch officer, and that as an elected official he must have the power to control his top lieutenants, who are high-level political appointees. In October 2021, the Texas Third Court of Appeals denied Paxton's bid to have the case dismissed and affirmed the trial court's order. In February 2023, Paxton reached a tentative agreement to pay $3.3 million in taxpayer money to the four whistleblowers. Later that month, the Public Integrity Section of the Justice Department in Washington D.C. assumed an investigation of Paxton that had previously been managed by federal prosecutors in Texas.

Ethics complaints pursuant to 2020 election challenges
In response to a complaint from Galveston Democrats that his challenges to the 2020 election were frivolous and unethical, a state disciplinary body ruled that a complaint against Paxton for professional misconduct could go forward. The complaint to the State Bar of Texas was initially dismissed by the Bar's chief disciplinary counsel, but was later revived by the Board of Disciplinary Appeals, and the State Bar launched an investigation into Paxton. Another ethics complaint alleging Paxton's election challenges were unethical and seeking sanctions or disbarment was filed by Lawyers Defending American Democracy. Among the signers of the LDAD complaint were four former presidents of the State Bar of Texas and a former chair of the Texas Supreme Court grievance oversight committee

Electoral history 
Attorney General elections

Texas Senate 8th district election

Texas House 70th district elections

References

External links

 Texas Attorney General website
 Ken Paxton's website
 
 

|-

|-

1962 births
21st-century American politicians
Activists from Texas
Baylor University alumni
Living people
Republican Party members of the Texas House of Representatives
People from McKinney, Texas
People from Minot, North Dakota
Tea Party movement activists
Texas Attorneys General
Texas lawyers
Republican Party Texas state senators
University of Virginia School of Law alumni